Nacoleia octasema, the banana scab moth, is a moth in the family Crambidae. It was described by Edward Meyrick in 1886. It is found on Vanuatu and in Indonesia, New Guinea, the Solomon Islands, New Caledonia, Fiji, Tonga, Samoa and Australia, where it has been recorded from Queensland.

References

octasema
Moths of Asia
Moths of Oceania
Moths described in 1886